The 2022 UniCredit Czech Open was a professional tennis tournament played on clay courts. It was the 29th edition of the tournament which was part of the 2022 ATP Challenger Tour. It took place in Prostějov, Czech Republic between 30 May and 4 June 2022.

Singles main-draw entrants

Seeds

 1 Rankings are as of 23 May 2022.

Other entrants
The following players received wildcards into the singles main draw:
  Martin Krumich
  Hamad Međedović
  Lukáš Pokorný

The following player received entry into the singles main draw as a special exempt:
  Lukáš Klein

The following player received entry into the singles main draw as an alternate:
  Vitaliy Sachko

The following players received entry from the qualifying draw:
  Térence Atmane
  Francisco Comesaña
  Martín Cuevas
  Alexander Erler
  Fábián Marozsán
  Lucas Miedler

The following players received entry as lucky losers:
  Benjamin Hassan
  Calvin Hemery
  Louis Wessels

Champions

Singles

  Vít Kopřiva def.  Dalibor Svrčina 6–2, 6–2.

Doubles

  Yuki Bhambri /  Saketh Myneni def.  Roman Jebavý /  Andrej Martin 6–3, 7–5.

References

2022 ATP Challenger Tour
2022
May 2022 sports events in the Czech Republic
June 2022 sports events in the Czech Republic